Monkokehampton is a village and civil parish in West Devon, England. The parish is bounded by Hatherleigh, Exbourne, Broadwoodkelly and Iddesleigh, and had a population of 139 at the 2011 Census.

Alternative names for Monkokehampton are "Monk Okehampton", "Okehampton" and "Okehampton Monk".

Features 
There are 16 listed buildings in Monkokehampton. Monkokehampton has a church called All Saints.

History 
Monkokehampton was recorded in the Domesday Book as Monuchementone/Monacochamentona. Monk Okehampton once belonged to Glastonbury Abbey. The parish was historically in the Black Torrington hundred. On the 25th of March 1885 Barntown, Upcott, and Lewersland were transferred from the parish of Monk Okehampton to the parish of Broadwood Kelly. The transferred area contained two houses in 1891.

References

External links 

Villages in the Borough of West Devon